A skyscraper generally refers to any building that is more than  tall and has more than 40 floors. The following is a list of countries with the most skyscrapers.

List of countries by number of completed skyscrapers 
The list includes all 64 countries that have at least one skyscraper.

References 

Skyscrapers,most